Bellefonte is a borough in, and the county seat of, Centre County in the U.S. state of Pennsylvania. It is approximately twelve miles northeast of State College and is part of the State College, Pennsylvania Metropolitan Statistical Area. The borough population was 6,187 at the 2010 census. It houses the Centre County Courthouse, located downtown on the diamond.  Bellefonte has also been home to five of Pennsylvania's governors, as well as two other governors.  All seven are commemorated in a monument located at Talleyrand Park.

The town features many examples of Victorian architecture. It is also home to the natural spring from which the town derives its name ("la belle fonte", bestowed by Charles Maurice de Talleyrand-Périgord during a land-speculation visit to central Pennsylvania in the 1790s).  However, the spring, which serves as the town's water supply, has been covered to comply with DEP water purity laws.  The early development of Bellefonte had been as a "natural town." It started with one house and a crossroad, then iron was found and the town grew.

History 

William Lamb sold his mill to John Dunlop in 1794. The following year, John’s father James Dunlop and John’s son-in-law James Harris (1756-1841) laid out the town that would become known as Bellefonte.

As the years went by, Bellefonte boomed and soon became the most influential town between Pittsburgh and Harrisburg.

Bellefonte Historic District 
The Bellefonte Historic District was added to the National Register of Historic Places in 1977.  Other buildings on the National Register of Historic Places are: Bellefonte Armory, Bellefonte Forge House, Brockerhoff Hotel, Centre County Courthouse, Gamble Mill, McAllister-Beaver House, Miles-Humes House, Pennsylvania Match Company, South Ward School, and the William Thomas House.  The Bellefonte Academy was listed until 2008, after having been destroyed by fire in 2004.

Bush House Hotel 
The Bush House Hotel was built in 1868-69 by Bellefonte attorney and developer Daniel G. Bush. It was one of the first hotels in the country to have electric lights. A man would stand at the train station and call out to the passengers, "Walk ya' to the Bush House." The Brockerhoff House, the Haag House, and other area hotels were competitors.  Many notable guests stayed at the Bush House including Thomas Edison.  The Bush House burned down on February 8, 2006.

Cadillac Building 
Another fire heavily damaged one of the borough's other landmark buildings less than four years later.  The Cadillac Building, so named because it was originally built as a Cadillac dealership in 1916, was a mix use commercial and residential property hit by a devastating fire on December 22, 2009.  Christmas tree lights in one of the apartment units were determined to be the cause.

Cadillac Building was rebuilt in 2016 and is now home to 11 two and three bedroom apartment units.  It remains a part of the Bellefonte Historic District.

Garman Opera House 
The Garman Opera House was originally built in 1890 and hosted many notable stars of the day including George Burns and Gracie Allen, Western performer Tom Mix, and illusionist/escape artist Harry Houdini.  The popular song "After the Ball" was said to have been first sung in public here.  It was eventually also used as a movie theater, first showing silent films and then "talkies."  By the early 1960s, the property was converted to primarily commercial/warehouse use.  In the 1990s, the building was restored and returned to its roots as a live performance venue and cinema.

The opera house was severely damaged by a fire on September 9, 2012 that also destroyed the Garman House Hotel.  The cause of the fire has been ruled as arson.  Preservationist groups' attempts to save the Garman were unsuccessful and the building was razed in January 2014.

Garman House was rebuilt in 2016 and is now home to 21 one and two bedroom apartment units.

Victorian era 
First-time visitors who walk along the Victorian streets of Bellefonte see primarily Victorian houses.  One of many examples is the Hastings Mansion, which was owned by Mrs. John Lane and was bought and remodeled by Governor Daniel H. Hastings.

In the 1800s, the first jail was built. It had an 8-foot underground dungeon, which was located on the rear of the lot of the present YMCA. A second jail was on East High Street.

Renaissance 
One of the town's historic sections experienced a renaissance in 2004. The Match Factory (officially the Pennsylvania Match Company), after standing vacant since 1947, was being renovated by the American Philatelic Society as their new home, one building at a time. The site was placed on the National Register of Historic Places in 2001.

Geography
Bellefonte is located in the Nittany Valley of the Ridge and Valley Appalachians. It lies 12 miles northeast of State College. Bellefonte is in the northwestern corner of and is surrounded by Spring Township.

Demographics

As of the 2010 census, the borough had 6,187 people, 2,837 households, and 1,496 families. The borough was 96.3% White, 1.5% Black or African American, 0.1% Native American, 0.5% Asian, 0.3% other, and 1.3% were two or more races. 1.4% of the population was of Hispanic or Latino ancestry.  The population density was 3,510.1 people per square mile (1,356.7/km²). There were 3,038 housing units at an average density of 1,669.2 per square mile (644.5/km²).

Of the 2,837 households, 23.2% had children under the age of 18 living with them, 39.2% were married couples living together, 3.5% had a male householder with no wife present, 10.1% had a female householder with no husband present, and 47.2% were non-families. 38.2% of all households were made up of individuals, and 10.7% had someone living alone who was 65 years of age or older. The average household size was 2.10 and the average family size was 2.81.

The population distribution by age was as follows: 18.4% under the age of 18, 9.3% from 18 to 24, 29.5% from 25 to 44, 25.7% from 45 to 64, and 17.1% who were 65 years of age or older. The median age was 39 years. For every 100 females there were 89.0 males. For every 100 females age 18 and over, there were 87.9 males.

The median income for a household in the borough was $48,211, and the median income for a family was $62,292.  The per capita income for the borough was $26,938. About 4.4% of families and 10.2% of the population were below the poverty line, including 3.8% of those under age 18 and 11.0% of those age 65 or over.

Economy
The Bellefonte area, as part of Centre County, typically enjoys one of the lowest unemployment rates in the state.  The primary industries are education, health care, construction, retail, and government.

Major employers

Bellefonte Area School District
Centre County Government
Geisinger Health System
Graymont
Hilex Poly
Restek
State Government
Supelco
U.S. Federal Government
Weis Markets
YMCA of Centre County

Prisons

The Centre County Correctional Facility is in Benner Township, just outside Bellefonte. It is county-run and houses between 250 - 300 inmates.

The State Correctional Institution – Rockview is a Pennsylvania Department of Corrections prison located in Benner Township, Pennsylvania,  from Bellefonte. The prison houses Pennsylvania's execution chamber.

The State Correctional Institution – Benner, a Pennsylvania Department of Corrections facility, is a 2,000 bed prison located adjacent to SCI Rockview.

Government

Federal
Bellefonte forms part of Pennsylvania's 15th congressional district.  The current representative is Glenn "G.T." Thompson.

County
Bellefonte is the county seat of Centre County and home to the Centre County Courthouse.

Local
The Borough of Bellefonte government is currently run by the following elected officials:
 Mayor: Gene "Buddy" Johnson 
 President of Council: Joanne Tosti-Vasey
 Vice President of Council: Randall Brachbill
 Council Members:
Evan Duffey
R. Michael Prendergast
Melissa Hombosky
Anne Walker
Renee Brown
Randall Brachbill
Jon Eaton
Doug Johnson
Joanne Tosti-Vasey

Education
Bellefonte Area School District operates public schools in the borough and wider area. Centre County Christian Academy is a private school located in Bellefonte. Since 1890, Catholic Education has been present in the Bellefonte community and vicinity through Saint John Parochial School. Saint John the Evangelist Roman Catholic School provides 3 and 4 year-old Pre-Kindergarten classes, as well as full-day instruction in Kindergarten through grade 5.

Bellefonte is 10 miles from Pennsylvania State University. Joel Rose of National Public Radio said, "These days, it seems everyone in Bellefonte has ties to Penn State, or knows someone who does."

Infrastructure

Transportation
Bellefonte is served by the Centre Area Transportation Authority for local bus service, linking Bellefonte to various points in State College including the Nittany Mall, downtown and the Penn State main campus.  The town is also served by the University Park Airport for commercial air travel.

Bellefonte does not have passenger train service, with the nearest Amtrak stations located in Lewistown (approximately 32 miles away) and Tyrone (approximately 35 miles away) and  serving Amtrak's Pennsylvanian train between Pittsburgh and New York City.

Law enforcement
The law enforcement agency in Bellefonte is the Bellefonte Police Department, headed by Chief Shawn P. Weaver.

Early railroads
Up to 1946 the Bellefonte Central Railroad served the town on a Bellefonte-Lemont (State College) route. Until 1933 the BCR continued the route south to Tyrone over the Pennsylvania Railroad's former Fairbrook Branch. Additionally, the Pennsylvania Railroad ran passenger trains from Altoona to Williamsport, after Milesburg heading into Bellefonte, then backing out to return to the Bald Eagle Valley Branch's route to continue the trip northeast. The last Altoona - Lock Haven train was between August 1950 and 1951. The PRR also operated trains until the late 1940s from Bellefonte south to Lemont (nearest train station to State College), then east to Northumberland and Sunbury, Pennsylvania.

Turnpikes and roads
A turnpike was created in 1822 after twenty years of construction. This turnpike, named The Northumberland and Anderson's Creek Turnpike, connected Bellefonte to Clearfield on the west and Sunbury on the east. Today, Pennsylvania Route 550 runs through the town. Interstate 99/US Route 220 pass by the eastern outskirts of the town.

Notable people 

 Jonathan Frakes - director, Star Trek actor
 George Grey Barnard – sculptor
 Alison Bechdel - cartoonist and graphic novelist
 Clifford Carlson – former University of Pittsburgh men's college basketball coach
 Todd Christensen – former NFL tight end
 Doyle Corman – former member of the Pennsylvania State Senate 
 Jake Corman – member of the Pennsylvania State Senate 
 Andrew Gregg Curtin – Governor of Pennsylvania (1861–1867)
 Nathan Alan Cutietta – documentary filmmaker
 Robert Alan Cutietta – author, composer, arts leader
 Inka Essenhigh - artist
 Scott Fry – former Director of the Joint Staff for the United States Department of Defense
 Chris Garner – tennis player (R16 in Australian Open 1993)
 John Irvin Gregg – Union army general
 Daniel H. Hastings – Governor of Pennsylvania (1895–1899)
 John W. Heston – former president of three universities
 William Harrison Holly – former United States federal judge
 Merle G. Kearns – former member of the Ohio House of Representatives
 Anna Keichline – first female architect to be certified in Pennsylvania
 James Knepper - former member of the Pennsylvania House of Representatives
 Eric Milton – Major League Baseball player
 David Petrikin – former member of the U.S. House of Representatives
 Thomas M. Reynolds – U.S. Congressman
 Jeremy Rose – horse jockey
 Joseph A. Smith – artist and professor at the Pratt Institute
 Matt Suhey - Chicago Bears fullback
 Glenn Thompson - member of the U.S. House of Representatives  
 Gregg Troy – college and Olympic swimming coach
 Jeff VanderMeer – author, editor, literary critic
 David Vogan – mathematician
 Jeffrey P. von Arx, S.J. – President of Fairfield University
 Richard L. Walker – author and former ambassador to South Korea
 John Montgomery Ward – Hall of Fame baseball player

See also

 Bellefonte and Snow Shoe Railroad
 Bellefonte Central Railroad

References

External links

 Bellefonte and surrounding area official community, dining, events and tourism website
 Borough of Bellefonte governmental website
 Bellefonte Intervalley Area Chamber of Commerce

County seats in Pennsylvania
Populated places established in 1795
Boroughs in Centre County, Pennsylvania
Nittany Valley
1795 establishments in Pennsylvania